The Belize Elections and Boundaries Commission is the primary electoral body in Belize.  It supervises all local and national elections. The commission also establishes the boundaries of Belize's electoral divisions.

Formation and duties
The EBC was formed in 1978 to oversee Belizean elections according to the Representation of the People Act. This Act became part of the Belize Constitution in 1981. The commission maintains a database of Belizean voters and periodically informs the nation on the state of the voter's list. It also occasionally makes proposals to revise boundaries in order to maintain near equality in voting divisions. There are currently 31 electoral divisions in Belize. 

The EBC has a chairman and four other persons on its board. The chairman and two members are appointed by the governor-general on the advice of the prime minister after consultation with the leader of the opposition; the remaining members are appointed similarly, with the concurrence of the leader of the opposition.

Delegation of duties
According to the Belize Constitution, the EBC delegates its responsibilities to the chief elections officer, who is not a member of the commission, and is officially in charge of voter registration, conduct of elections, and voter education.

Members of the EBC
 Chairman: Karl H. Menzies
 Alberto August
 Derek Courtenay
 Dean Lindo
 Samira Musa Pott

See also
 Elections in Belize
 Elections and Boundaries Department

1978 establishments in Belize
Elections in Belize
Politics of Belize
Belize
Boundary commissions